Espinosa is a barrio in the municipality of Vega Alta, Puerto Rico. Its population in 2010 was 11,706.

History
Puerto Rico was ceded by Spain in the aftermath of the Spanish–American War under the terms of the Treaty of Paris of 1898 and became an unincorporated territory of the United States. In 1899, the United States Department of War conducted a census of Puerto Rico finding that the population of Espinosa barrio was 781.

Gallery

See also

 List of communities in Puerto Rico

References 

Barrios of Vega Alta, Puerto Rico